The SANFL minor premiership is awarded to the team that finishes on top of the minor round ladder at the end of the Home and Away season.
There were no Grand Finals contested between 1877 (the inaugural season) and 1897, hence the Minor Premier was also the Premiership winner.
The only exceptions were in 1889 and 1894 where there was a play off as the two teams finished the season on the same points.
For 1877 the inaugural season - the two top teams were declared joint Champions. Each team had played in different amounts of games against different opponents but had only both lost one game each.

Minor Premiership Rankings

See also
List of SANFL premiers

References

South Australian National Football League
SANFL minor premiers